Willesden New Cemetery is a civic cemetery  at Franklyn Road, Willesden, in the London Borough of Brent. It opened in 1891 and includes a memorial to local civilians who died in World War II. It previously included chapels, now demolished, by Charles H Worley.

The cemetery contains war graves of 130 Commonwealth service personnel who died in World War I and 121 who died in World War II. Most of these graves are scattered throughout the cemetery apart from 39 World War II graves forming an informal group, while a Screen Wall memorial lists personnel from both wars whose graves could not be individually marked by headstones.

See also
 Liberal Jewish Cemetery, Willesden
 Willesden Jewish Cemetery

References

External links

 Official website
 

Willesden New Cemetery
Willesden New Cemetery
Willesden New Cemetery
Willesden New Cemetery
Willesden New Cemetery